Đặng Anh Tuấn (born 1 August 1994) is a Vietnamese footballer who plays as a midfielder for V.League 1 club SHB Đà Nẵng.

Honours
SHB Đà Nẵng
V.League 1: Runner-up 2013 
Vietnamese National Cup: Runner-up 2013

External links

References 

1994 births
Living people
Vietnamese footballers
Association football midfielders
V.League 1 players
SHB Da Nang FC players